Sisnando Menéndez was a bishop of Iria Flavia in Galicia, known as Sisnando II, from 952–68. He appears to have been killed in a Viking raid. He was the son of Hermenegildo Alóitez and his successor was Pelayo Rodríguez.

References

Spanish bishops
10th-century people from the Kingdom of León